Nikolay Nikolayevich Alexeyenko (born 29 November 1971, Izium, Kharkiv Oblast) is a Russian political figure, deputy of the 8th State Duma convocation. In 2013 he was awarded a Candidate of Legal Sciences degree from the Moscow State Linguistic University. The same year he co-founded and became the head of The Rating Agency of Building Complex (R.A.B.C.) aiming to develop and provide independent ratings and rankings in the field of construction industry. He left his post in September 2021 as he was elected to the State Duma of 8th convocation as a deputy of the Bryansk Oblast. He run with the United Russia.

References

1971 births
Living people
People from Izium
United Russia politicians
21st-century Russian politicians
Eighth convocation members of the State Duma (Russian Federation)